The Steam Room is a United Kingdom reality television show hosted by Jo Guest and Michelle Marsh. The first season, hosted by Jo Guest was broadcast in autumn 2004 and the second was co-hosted by Michelle Marsh with Richard Alexander (September 2006 to January 2007). Both seasons were broadcast on the Men and Motors cable/satellite channel in the United Kingdom, operated by ITV.

External links
 Men & Motors
 The Steam Room

2000s British reality television series
2004 British television series debuts
2004 British television series endings